Iraia Te Ama-o-te-rangi Te Whaiti (1861 – 15 November 1918) was a notable New Zealand tribal leader, farmer and historian. Of Māori descent, he identified with the Ngāti Kahungunu iwi. He was born in the Wairarapa, New Zealand in 1861.

References

1861 births
1918 deaths
20th-century New Zealand historians
People from the Wairarapa
Ngāti Kahungunu people
19th-century New Zealand historians